Meir Yaakov Soloveichik (born July 29, 1977) is an American Orthodox rabbi and writer. He is the son of Rabbi Eliyahu Soloveichik, grandson of Rabbi Ahron Soloveichik; and a great nephew of Rabbi Joseph B. Soloveitchik, the leader of American Jewry who identified with what became known as Modern Orthodoxy.

Education
Soloveichik learned in Cheder Lubavitch Hebrew Day School of Chicago (in Skokie, IL) for elementary and Brisk Yeshiva high school (Chicago, IL) run by his grandfather, Ahron Soloveichik. He then graduated from Yeshiva College in New York City, where he also received rabbinic ordination (semicha) at Rabbi Isaac Elchanan Theological Seminary and studied philosophy of religion at Yale University Divinity School, although he did not receive a degree from Yale.  He later received a PhD in Religion from Princeton University. He wrote his doctorate on the modern Orthodox theologian Michael Wyschogrod.

Career
A regular contributor to general interest and Jewish publications such as First Things, The Forward, Commentary Magazine, and the journal Azure, where he was Contributing Editor, he has written a number of articles concerning issues in Jewish thought and life, the relationship between Judaism and Christianity and the limits of interfaith dialogue established by Rabbi Joseph B. Soloveitchik.

He was the resident scholar of the Jewish Center in New York City, and later, Associate Rabbi at Congregation Kehilath Jeshurun, also in New York City.  In May 2013, he became Rabbi of Congregation Shearith Israel in New York City, a Sephardic synagogue, and the oldest Jewish congregation in the United States.

He is the director of the Straus Center for Torah and Western Thought at Yeshiva University.

It had been reported that he had been considered a candidate to replace Jonathan Sacks as the Chief Rabbi of the United Kingdom. However, the position ultimately went to Ephraim Mirvis.

In August 2012, he gave the invocation at the opening session of the 2012 Republican National Convention in Tampa, Florida.

Brisker rabbinic dynasty

Religious writings
 "The Virtue of Hate," First Things (February, 2003)
 "How Soloveitchik Saw Interreligious Dialogue," The Forward (2003)
 "Sanctity of Union: An Article of Faith," The Forward (2003)
 "Redemption and the Power of Man," Azure (2004)
 "Orthodoxy and the Public Square - Symposium," Tradition (2004)
 "The Jewish Mother: A Theology," Azure (2005)
 "God's Beloved: A Defense of Chosenness," Azure (2005)
 "How Not to Become a Jew," Commentary (2006)
 "Locusts, Giraffes, and the Meaning of Kashrut," Azure (2006)
 "Rabbi Akiva's Optimism," Azure (2007)
 "Of (Religious) Fences and Neighbors," Commentary (March, 2007)
 "A Nation Under God: Jews, Christians, and the American Public Square," (2007/8)
 "No Friend in Jesus,"  First Things (January, 2008)
 "Why Beards?," Commentary (February, 2008)
 "Mysteries of the Menorah," Commentary (March, 2008)
 "God's First Love: The Theology of Michael Wyschogrod," First Things (November, 2009)
 "To be German and Jewish : Hermann Cohen and Rabbi Samson Raphael Hirsch," Rav Chesed II (2009)
 "Against Cloning - Symposium," Tradition (2010)
 "Jonah and Yom Kippur," Jewish Ideas Daily (September 2010)
 "Torah and Incarnation," First Things (October, 2010)
 "God's Beloved: Election and Tradition in the Theology of Michael Wyschogrod,"" PhD. Dissertation, Princeton University, (2010)
 "The Universalism of Particularity," Hain, S and Hirt,R.S. (eds.), The Next Generation of Modern Orthodoxy (2012)
 "Blessed Unions: What the Traditional Jewish Wedding Tells Us About the American Founding," Commentary (2012)

Political writings
 "Irving Kristol, Edmund Burke, and the Rabbis," Jewish Review of Books (2011)
 "Redefining Religious Activity," Jewish Ideas Daily (February 2012)
 "Morality, Not Theology: The Importance of Romney's Liberty University Speech," The Weekly Standard (May 2012)
 "A Weakness for Royalty: The Vindication of John Adams,"The Weekly Standard (June 2012)
 "Bibi - Son of Benzion: The Netanyahu Legacy,"" The Weekly Standard (August 2012)
 "The Real Israel Lobby: It's the American people," The Weekly Standard (February 2013)
 "King David," First Things (January 2017)

Lectures and sermons
 'Can All Religions Be True?' (2005)
 'The Yibbum of Henry VIII' (2009)
 'Torah Giants Confront Modernity: A Study of Rabbanim in the Age of Enlightenment' (2010)

Judaism and the Origins of America
 'The Founding Father at the Huppah: A Reflection on America's Beginnings'
 'Lincoln's Yahrzeit: Pesah and the Death of an American President'
 'Mordecai Manuel Noah: The First Truly American Jew'
 'Light and Truth: Hebrew in Early America'

Personal
He is married to Layaliza Soloveichik (née Klein), a 1997 graduate of Yale University Law School.

References

External links
http://www.cross-currents.com/archives/2006/02/20/meir-soloveichik-takes-on-the-issues/
http://haemtza.blogspot.com/2007/03/rabbi-meir-yaakov-soloveichik.html
https://web.archive.org/web/20120226232231/http://seforim.traditiononline.org/index.cfm/2009/1/25/Thoughts-on-Confrontation--Sundry-Matters-Part-I-

Yeshiva University faculty
American Orthodox rabbis
Jewish American writers
Modern Orthodox rabbis
Princeton University alumni
Rabbi Isaac Elchanan Theological Seminary semikhah recipients
Soloveitchik rabbinic dynasty
Yale Divinity School alumni
Yeshiva University alumni
Living people
1977 births
21st-century American essayists
21st-century American male writers
American male non-fiction writers
21st-century American rabbis